Akanda Football Club (formerly Sapins Football Club) is a Gabonese football club based in Libreville, Gabon. The club plays in the highest level league of Gabon – Gabon Championnat National D1.

External links
 Profile

Football clubs in Gabon
Football clubs in Libreville
2010 establishments in Gabon